Arild "Hulk" Haugen (born 30 December 1985) is a former strongman and currently a professional boxer from Sirdal, Norway. He set the Guinness World Record for being the youngest WSM competitor. He currently lives in Sandnes, Rogaland.

It was suggested that Haugen has much potential, and in future strongman competitions would rival the impressive records set by Mariusz Pudzianowski; indeed his performance in the 2008 WSM contest caught the attention of many, breaking the world record for the Atlas Stones in his heat with an absurd time of 16.14 seconds to successfully make the final (he would also post the fastest time in the Atlas Stones in the final). However Haugen has now retired from strongman, to seek a future in boxing.

Haugen's first career fight was on 11 December 2009 against Latvian Pāvels Dolgovs. Haugen won by knockout 45 seconds into the first round. He officially became a member of TreyWay Maudland after his first fight.

References

External links
Official web site

1985 births
Living people
Norwegian strength athletes
People from Vest-Agder
People from Sandnes
Norwegian male boxers
Sportspeople from Agder